Pasupathi c/o Rasakkapalayam is a Tamil language film directed by K. Selva Bharathy and released on 5 October 2007. It stars Ranjith, Sindhu Tolani, and Vivek. The music was composed by Deva.

Plot
Pasupathy (Ranjith) lives with his mother in a village and comes to town with the intent of finding a job. He fights against a few thugs and hands them over to police constable Daas (Vivek), following which Daas is promoted to sub-inspector. Pasupathy accompanies Daas and his team most of the time. Pasupathy's mother is diagnosed with a heart problem, and he is need of 500,000 rupees for the surgery. Pasupathy tries in vain to collect money with the help of Daas and Priya (Sindhu Tolani).

Pasupathy contacts a Naxalite group which promises to pay him the required money if he surrenders to the police instead of the wanted Naxalite. Pasupathy agrees and surrenders, but the money does not reach him as the Naxalite (Ilavarasu) who was supposed to pay the money had other problems. The Naxalite group decides to save Pasupathy by surrendering themselves and also give the money needed for the operation, but they are cheated by the assistant commissioner, who does not hand over the money to Pasupathy.

Daas gets the help of the human rights commission, and finally, Pasupathy is proved to be innocent and is released from jail. He also raises the required money with the help of Daas and Priya. However, doctors advise that his mother's health condition worsened and surgery might not save her. Pasupathy insists the doctors to perform the surgery. The surgery is performed but seems unsuccessful as his mother becomes unconscious after surgery. Pasupathy is heartbroken and cries at her feet in the hospital. Suddenly, his mother regains consciousness and wakes up, but Pasupathy dies at her feet.

Cast
Ranjith as Pasupathy
Sindhu Tolani as Priya
Vivek as Inspector Daas
Ilavarasu as Terrorist 
Manobala as Head Constable Naidu
Ganja Karuppu as Karuppu
Paravai Muniyamma as Priya's grandmother 
Meghna Nair as Savithiri

Soundtrack
The soundtrack was composed by Deva, and lyrics were written by K. Selva Bharathy.

Critical reception
Sify wrote, "Except for Vivek’s comedy there is nothing worthwhile in the film. The second half of the story goes haywire, the film drags and the large doses of old fashioned mother sentiments in the climax leave you exhausted".

References

2007 films
Films scored by Deva (composer)
2000s Tamil-language films
Films directed by K. Selva Bharathy